Rock Transgresivo is the debut album of the Spanish hard rock band Extremoduro. After recording their demo tape Rock Transgresivo in January 1989, they released their first studio album Tú en Tu Casa, Nosotros en la Hoguera. The result left them unsatisfied so the original demo tape was remixed and partially re-recorded and it was released in August 1994 in order to replace the older studio album.

Background, recording and production
In 1987 the band was on hiatus when Roberto Iniesta decided to come back with Salo and Luis "von Fanta" as new members in 1988. They hadn't enough money for recording a studio album so they sold tickets that would be exchanged for the album. When they sold 250 tickets they had earned enough money to afford the recording. At January 1989 they started the recording of their first 7 songs on Duplimatic Studios in Madrid, containing Extremaydura, Emparedado, Decidí, Romperás, Arrebato, Jesucristo García, La Hoguera.

The distribution of the demo tape Rock Transgresivo began to attract attention inside and outside their home region of Plasencia; it was so well received that the Catalan television program Plastic invited them for a live performance. They were then selected for the national final of the Yamaha trophy in which they finished third.

After their appearance on the TV, Avispa Music noticed them and offered them a three-year contract. The album was recorded that summer, containing the same songs as Rock Transgresivo (in addition to "Amor Castúo"). It was made "in a big hurry and few resources," so that from the outset the result leaves them unsatisfied. The technical and economic problems with the label started at the recording, so a few years later they would decide to re-release the album.

Track listing
All songs written by Roberto Iniesta.

Rock Transgresivo (1994)

In 1994 they decided to remix and re-record partially their demo tape in order to replace their first studio album.
This new studio album contains three more tracks than the original demo tape. This version was released on 26 August 1994.

Track listing
All songs written by Roberto Iniesta.

Certifications

Personnel 
Extremoduro
 Robe Iniesta: Guitar and vocals
 Salo: Bass
 Luis "von Fanta": Drums
Additional Personnel for 1994 version
 Iñaki Buenrostro: Triangle
 Iñaki "Uoho" Antón (Platero y Tú): Guitar and keyboards
 Juantxu Olano (Platero y Tú): Bass (in the new songs)
 Iratxe (Quattro Clavos): Backing vocals

References

External links 
 Extremoduro official website (in Spanish)

Extremoduro albums
1989 debut albums
1994 albums
Spanish-language albums
Crowdfunded albums